Hal Andrew Lindes is an American–English guitarist and film score composer.

In 1979, he played guitar with the new wave group Darling. Signed to Charisma Records, they released the single "Do You Wanna" (written by Lindes) and published the album Put It Down To Experience the same year, before breaking up.

Lindes is best known for his work as a full-time member of British rock band Dire Straits from 1980 until 1985.

Dire Straits (1980–1985)
Lindes became a full-time member of Dire Straits at the end of 1980, shortly after the release of the group's third album, Making Movies. He replaced original co-founding member and rhythm guitarist David Knopfler. Lindes toured with Dire Straits while they were promoting Making Movies and remained with the band while they recorded their fourth album, 1982's Love Over Gold. Lindes was also with the band for the EP titled ExtendedancEPlay released in early 1983, which included the hit single “Twisting by the Pool”.

Also during 1982 and 1983, Dire Straits’ frontman Mark Knopfler was  involved with composing the music score for David Puttnam's film Local Hero, in which Lindes also performed. It was at this point that he discovered a passion for composing film soundtracks. Lindes toured with Dire Straits for their 1982–1983 Love over Gold Tour. The band's double live album Alchemy: Dire Straits Live was a recording of excerpts from the final two concerts from that tour at London's Hammersmith Odeon in July 1983, featuring Lindes, and was released in March 1984.

In early 1985, while Dire Straits were recording tracks for their Brothers In Arms album, Lindes left the band to compose film soundtracks and work as a session musician.

Film scores and other work (1984–present)

In 1984, Lindes played guitar on Tina Turner’s hit "Private Dancer", from the album of the same name.

Since his departure from Dire Straits, Lindes has composed music for films, and has won a Royal Television Society Award for the BAFTA award nominated film Reckless and a TRIC award for Best TV Theme Music. Lindes composed the soundtrack to The Boys Are Back, a Miramax film directed by Scott Hicks and starring Clive Owen, in which his guitar score is paired with songs by Sigur Rós, Ray Lamontagne and Carla Bruni.

In 1989, Lindes teamed up with rock singer Fish to contribute guitar to his debut solo album following his departure from Marillion. Vigil in a Wilderness of Mirrors was released in January 1990, and Lindes co-wrote three songs on the album. He composed the theme music for the 1990s BBC TV series Between the Lines.

Personal life
Lindes has four children and is the father of musician and model Staz Lindes.

References

External links 
 
 
 
 

American male composers
20th-century American composers
American rock guitarists
American male guitarists
English rock guitarists
English male guitarists
English composers
1953 births
Living people
Dire Straits members
Rhythm guitarists
People from Monterey, California
20th-century American guitarists